BL Crucis is a red giant and a semiregular variable in the constellation of Crux. It has periods with three frequencies of 30.7, 42.3 and 43.6 days. It is 480 ± 10 light-years distant from Earth.

References

External  links 
David H. Levy, Observing variable stars : a guide for the beginner 
 General Catalogue of Variable Stars

Crux (constellation)
Semiregular variable stars
M-type giants
Crucis, BL
108396
4739
Durchmusterung objects
060781